Shin Seung-hun (born 21 March 1966) is a South Korean singer-songwriter who was known in the 1990s as the "Emperor of Ballads." He debuted in 1990 with the hit song, "Reflection of You in Your Smile," and has since released 12 studio albums. Before 2020, he held the record for the most albums sold by one artist in South Korea with 17 million albums sold over his career.

Discography

Studio albums

Awards and nominations

Golden Disc Awards

Mnet Asian Music Awards

See also 

 List of best-selling albums in South Korea

References

External links
 Official Site 
 Website by Avex Group 

Grand Prize Golden Disc Award recipients
South Korean pop singers
South Korean folk rock singers
20th-century South Korean male singers
South Korean guitarists
People from Daejeon
1966 births
Living people
MAMA Award winners
21st-century South Korean male singers
Melon Music Award winners
South Korean male singer-songwriters
Chungnam National University alumni